Lachlan Hearne (born 19 December 2000) is an Australian cricketer. He made his first-class debut on 3 April 2021, for New South Wales in the 2020–21 Sheffield Shield season. Prior to his first-class debut, he was named in Australia's squad for the 2020 Under-19 Cricket World Cup. He made his List A debut on 14 February 2022, for New South Wales in the 2021–22 Marsh One-Day Cup.

References

External links
 

2000 births
Living people
Australian cricketers
New South Wales cricketers
Place of birth missing (living people)